Asian Highway 15 (AH15) is a road in the Asian Highway Network running  from Vinh, Vietnam to Udon Thani, Thailand connecting AH1 to AH12. The route is as follows:

Vietnam
  QL8: Vinh - Cau Treo

Laos
  Route 8: Nam Phao - Vieng Kham
  Route 13 (Concurrent with ): Vieng Kham - Thakhek

Thailand
  Route 295: Third Thai–Lao Friendship Bridge
 Route 212: At Samat - Nakhon Phanom
 Route 22: Nakhon Phanom - Udon Thani

Asian Highway Network
Roads in Thailand
Roads in Vietnam
Roads in Laos